Dingad or Dingat was a late 5th century Welsh saint and early Christian church founder.

He is recorded in all the early 'Brychan documents' as a son of King Brychan, King of the Welsh kingdom of Brycheiniog in south-east Wales.

He was patron of Llandingat Church (in Llandovery) in Carmarthenshire and of Dingestow in Monmouthshire. It is, however, sometimes suggested that the latter village's titular is Dingad ap Nudd Hael, so-called 'King of Brynbuga' (Usk in Monmouthshire).

References

Sources
Farmer, David Hugh. (1978). The Oxford Dictionary of Saints. Oxford: Oxford University Press.

People from Powys
Welsh royalty
5th-century Christian saints
Children of Brychan
5th-century Welsh people